Anya Pencheva (born 12 September 1957) is a Bulgarian actress.

Biography

She was born in Smolyan, but soon after that her family relocated to Troyan. Pencheva has performed on numerous occasions in the youth theater (Bulgarian: Младежки театър), which she describes as the best years in her life.

Pencheva has been married twice - to sports journalist Sasho Dikov and Ivaylo Karanyotov.

References

External links
 

1957 births
Living people
Bulgarian stage actresses
Bulgarian film actresses
20th-century Bulgarian actresses
21st-century Bulgarian actresses
People from Smolyan